Vijayraghavgarh is a town, tehsil headquarters, and a nagar panchayat located in Katni district in the Indian state of Madhya Pradesh.

Demographics
 India census, Vijayraghavgarh had a population of 7,157. Males constitute 53% of the population and females 47%. Vijayraghavgarh has an average literacy rate of 67%, higher than the national average of 59.5%: male literacy is 76%, and female literacy is 56%. In the town, 16% of the population is under 6 years of age.

Geography
The STD code is 07626 and Pin code 483775 Postal headquarter. The nearest RTO is Katni. The town in accessible by road.

Public representatives (MLA)

References

Tehsil in Katni
Cities and towns in Katni district
Katni